Clubul Sportiv Building Vânju Mare, commonly known as Building Vânju Mare, or simply as Building, was a Romanian football club based in Vânju Mare, Mehedinți County, founded in 2002 and dissolved in 2009. 

The club was established in 2002 by the merger between Real Vânju Mare and Constructorul Drobeta-Turnu Severin. Building played its home matches at first on Municipal Stadium in Drobeta-Turnu Severin, then moving on Victoria Stadium in Vânju Mare and Dunărea Stadium in Orșova. At its best, Building played in the second tier, Liga II, but with no notable results.

History
CS Building Vânju Mare was established in the summer of 2002, as a result of the merger between the newly-promoted in the third tier, AS Real Vânju Mare and the 4th tier member, Constructorul Drobeta-Turnu Severin, owned by Mihaela Giuca. The new team obtained the promotion to Divizia B after only one year since its establishment.

In the seven seasons of existence, "the Builders" activated in the third tier (Liga III) during the 2002–03 (2nd place), 2005–06 (1st place), 2007–08 (7th place) and 2008–09 (5th place) seasons, and in the Liga II during the 2003–04 (12th place), 2004–05 (14th place) and 2006–07 (15th place) editions.

Mihaela Giuca's team played its home matches on the Municipal Stadium in Drobeta-Turnu Severin in the first two seasons of Divizia B. After the first relegation, in 2005, Building returned on the Victoria Stadium in Vânju Mare, with a capacity of 1,000 seats. After another three years, Building moved to Orșova, following a conflict with the Commune of Vânju Mare, which allowed Minerul Mehedinți to play its home matches on the same ground.

Building withdrew from Liga III in the summer of 2009 and subsequently was dissolved.

Honours

Leagues
Liga III:
Winners (1): 2005–06
Runners-up (1): 2002–03

References

External links
 CS Building Vânju Mare at soccerway.com

Association football clubs established in 2002
Association football clubs disestablished in 2009
Defunct football clubs in Romania
Football clubs in Mehedinți County
Liga II clubs
Liga III clubs
2002 establishments in Romania
2009 disestablishments in Romania